John O’Hara is an American retired soccer defender who played professionally in the American Soccer League and Major Indoor Soccer League.

O’Hara graduated from Mt. Lebanon High School   He attended the University of Pittsburgh, playing on the men's soccer team in 1977 and 1978.  In 1979, he turned professional with the Pennsylvania Stoners of the American Soccer League.  O’Hara returned in 1980 as the Stoners won the league title.  In the fall of 1979, O’Hara moved indoors with the Pittsburgh Spirit of the Major Indoor Soccer League.  In 1980, the Spirit sent him to the Cleveland Force but he was back in Pittsburgh in 1981.  O’Hara remained with the Spirit until it folded in 1986.  He then signed with the Minnesota Strikers where he played for two seasons.

References

External links
 MISL/ASL stats

Living people
1959 births
American soccer players
American Soccer League (1933–1983) players
Cleveland Force (original MISL) players
Major Indoor Soccer League (1978–1992) players
Minnesota Strikers (MISL) players
Pittsburgh Panthers men's soccer players
Pittsburgh Spirit players
Pennsylvania Stoners players
Association football defenders